Geraldo Cleofas Dias Alves (16 April 1954 – 26 August 1976), better known as Geraldo Assoviador, was a Brazilian International footballer.

Career
Geraldo Assoviador spent his entire career at Flamengo of Rio de Janeiro. In the Brazilian league, he appeared in 58 games and scored one goal. In all the competitions played for Flamengo he has a total of 168 matches and 13 goals. He has 5 caps for Brazil representing the country at the 1975 Copa América.

Personal life
His brother Washington Geraldo Dias Alves is a former professional footballer too, having played ten years of his career in Portugal – mainly with Varzim – where his children were born to a Portuguese mother.
His nephews Geraldo, Bruno, and Júlio also played the sport.

Death
He died on 26 August 1976 at age 22 after a tonsillitis operation. Although the intervention went as planned, the player suffered an anaphylaxis shock due to the local anesthesia that produced a cardiac arrest.

Honours

Club
Flamengo
Campeonato Carioca: 1974
Taça Guanabara: 1973

International
Brazil
Taça do Atlântico: 1976

References

External links

Geraldo Cleofas Dias Alves profile at Mamvs.narod.ru

Geraldo Cleofas Dias Alves article at Flamengoalternativo.com

Brazilian footballers
Brazil international footballers
1954 births
1976 deaths
Association football midfielders